The Bayard Rustin Educational Complex – also known as the Humanities Educational Complex – at West 18th Street between Eighth and Ninth Avenues in the Chelsea neighborhood of Manhattan, New York City, is a "vertical campus" of the New York City Department of Education which contains a number of small public schools, most of them high schools — grades 9 through 12 – along with one combined middle and high school – grades 6 through 12.

The building formerly housed Bayard Rustin High School for the Humanities (M440), a comprehensive school which graduated its last class in the 2011-2012 school year.

History 
The building – which is actually two buildings, one on 18th Street and the other on 19th Street, connected in the middle – was constructed in 1930 as Textile High School, a vocational high school for the textile trades, complete with a textile mill in the basement; the school yearbook was titled The Loom. It was later renamed Straubenmuller Textile High School after the vocational education pioneer Gustave Straubenmuller, then renamed Charles Evans Hughes High School after Governor of New York and U.S. Supreme Court Chief Justice Charles Evans Hughes.

In 1952, the Senate Internal Security Subcommittee, which investigated Communist influence in schools, accused two-thirds of New York City teachers of being "card-carrying Communists." Irving Adler, Mathematics Department chair at Straubenmuller and executive member of the Teachers Union, was subpoenaed by the subcommittee but refused to cooperate, invoking his rights under the Fifth Amendment. He was fired. Adler later admitted being a member of the Communist Party USA.

In the wake of disciplinary problems so bad that teachers picketed the school, it was shut down in June 1983, and reopened in Sept 1983 as the High School for the Humanities with a revamped curriculum focusing on English and the humanities. It was later renamed the Bayard Rustin High School for the Humanities after civil rights activist Bayard Rustin.

In January 2009, following publicized difficulties, including safety issues, a Regents Test scandal – in which the school's administration falsified test scores to push up the school's average – and a continuing low graduation rate, the Department of Education announced that the school would not accept any ninth-graders in the fall of 2009, and that it would close after its last students graduate in 2012.

Repurposing 
By 2005, the school building had already begun to host other, smaller public school entities in addition to the comprehensive high school.  In the 2012-2013 school year, there were six schools in the facility:

Quest to Learn (M422)
Hudson High School of Learning Technologies (M437)
Humanities Preparatory Academy (M605)
James Baldwin School (M313)
Landmark High School (M419)
Manhattan Business Academy (M392)

With the exception of Quest to Learn (Q2L), all of the schools are high schools. Q2L, which moved into the building just before the 2010-2011 school year, started with three grades (6-9) and added a grade each year until it was a full middle and high school in September 2015.

Physical facilities 
The original upper floors were well-appointed, with marble-lined hallways, stained glass windows, and wood-paneled offices. In 1934–35, the Work Projects Administration's Federal Arts Project decorated the schools with murals, some created by artist Jacques Van Aalten; but muralist Jean Charlot was also called in to oversee the work already in progress of art students – including Abraham Lishinsky – titled The Art Contribution to Civilization of All Nations and Countries. He himself painted a central niche, which he named Head, Crowned with Laurels; this latter was overpainted after the completion of the mural, and Charlot listed the mural as "destroyed" in catalogs of his work. It was restored by the Adopt-A-Mural Program, with mural restoration completed in 1995. It is now an interior architectural landmark. In 1999 a theatrical lighting system and rigging renovation for the school auditorium was completed with the help of PENCIL, Public Education Needs Civic Involvement in Learning.

The building also features a swimming pool, which was expected to be refurbished and returned to service as of the 2010–2011 academic year, but did not return to service until the 2012-13 school year. The pool is now being used by the schools for recreation as well as a lifeguard training program.

Notable alumni of the comprehensive high school 
 Herman Badillo - Bronx Borough President

 Saideh A. Brown - President of the National Council of Women of the United States at the United Nations

 Patricia Bath - first African American woman doctor to receive a patent for a medical invention
 John Ross Bowie - actor
 David Carradine - actor
 Remy Charlip - artist, writer, choreographer, theatre director, designer and teacher
 Barry Michael Cooper- journalist and filmmaker
 David Brion Davis - historian, authority on slavery and abolition in the Western world
 Janice Erlbaum - slam poet
 Jose Feliciano - singer and guitarist ("Light My Fire", "Feliz Navidad")
 Vincent Gigante - boss of the Genovese crime family
 Cecelia Goetz - lawyer
 Andre Harrell (1960-2020) - record executive, executive producer, founder of Uptown Records
 John Isaacs - pioneering African-American basketball professional
 Azazel Jacobs - filmmaker
 Pee Wee Kirkland - former street basketball player; played for the school's basketball team and made All-City guard.
 Kodama (wrestler) - Louie Rodriguez, American professional wrestler and actor
 Ed Kovens - actor and Method acting instructor
 Johnny Maestro - John Mastrangelo, singer with The Crests, The Del-Satins and Johnny Maestro & the Brooklyn Bridge ("16 Candles"), ("The Worst That Could Happen")
 Rana Zoe Mungin - writer and teacher
 ASAP Rocky - Rakim Mayers, American rapper
 Jason Samuels Smith - American tap dance performer, choreographer, and director
 Sol Schiff (1917–2012) - table tennis player
 Nina Sky - Nicole and Natalie Albino, musical duo
 Felix Solis - actor
 Mario Sorrenti - photographer
 Davide Sorrenti - photographer
 Howard Stein - financier
 Stza - Frontman for the band Leftöver Crack
 Cicely Tyson - award-winning stage and film actress
 Shawn Wayans - actor
 Vincent Schofield Wickham - editorial artist and sculptor who taught advertising art and layout at Textile High School
 Jason Samuels Smith (1980) - Emmy award-winning dancer

References

External links 

Hudson High School of Learning Technologies DOE webpage
Humanities Preparatory Academy DOE webpage
James Baldwin School DOE webpage
Landmark High School DOE webpage
Manhattan Business Academy DOE webpage
Quest to Learn DOE webpage
 
Bayard Rustin H.S. of Humanities alumni website

Public high schools in Manhattan
Public middle schools in Manhattan
Chelsea, Manhattan
1930 establishments in New York City